David Steven Meihuizen (born ) is a South African rugby union player for the  in Super Rugby and  in the Currie Cup and the Rugby Challenge. His regular position is lock.

Due to a concussion caused during a game in the 2022 season he has been forced to retire.

References

South African rugby union players
Living people
1997 births
Rugby union players from Cape Town
Rugby union locks
Stormers players
Western Province (rugby union) players